, also known as Yoo Soo-young and professionally as Shoo, is a Korean-Japanese actress and singer who debuted as a member of the South Korean girl group S.E.S. in 1997 and continued until 2002 when the group disbanded. She contributed songs as a solo artist after the group's disbandment before she went on hiatus from her music career to pursue an acting career in 2006. She returned to the music scene with releasing her single album Devote One's Love in 2010. Afterwards, she went back on hiatus for four years before transitioning back into acting in 2014.

Early life 
Shoo was born Shū Kunimitsu on 23 October 1981, in Yokohama, Japan. Her mother and her father are ethnic Koreans. She was initially part of a mixed-gender project group with Son Ho-young and Danny Ahn of g.o.d and Kim Hwan-sung of NRG but she decided to join SM Entertainment after successfully auditioning for the company.

Career

1997–2002: S.E.S. 

Shoo made her debut with S.E.S. in 1997. The group debuted with the album I'm Your Girl and lead single of the same name on 1 November 1997. The group since went on to become the top-selling K-pop girl group for their generation of artists. Since their debut, the group has released five Korean albums and two Japanese albums. The group officially parted ways in 2002, due to the expiry of their contracts with SM Entertainment. Members Bada and Eugene left SM Entertainment after the expiry of their initial contracts, while Shoo stayed with SM Entertainment until 2006.

2003–2015: Solo Career 
Shoo remained signed under SM Entertainment until 2006. In the time during which she was signed, Shoo participated on SM Town albums in 2003 and 2004. In 2006, Shoo departed from SM Entertainment and signed onto JIIN Entertainment. In 2005, she began her stage musical career in the Korean adaptation of Bat Boy: The Musical, which sold over 110,000 tickets in Korea and Japan. In December 2006, she stated that she would pursue acting and would be putting her singing career on hiatus.

In January 2010, Shoo returned to the music scene with the release of her first mini-album, Devote One's Love with the lead track "Only You".

In March 2014, Shoo signed with RUN Entertainment and returned to her career as an actress.

In December 2014, Shoo along with her bandmate Bada made a special comeback on Infinite Challenge, in the episode "Saturday for Singers", and performed two songs ("I'm Your Girl" and "I Love You") with Girls' Generation member Seohyun, who was filling in for Eugene due to her pregnancy, but they stated that she wished they could have performed together. In January 2015, she appeared on the show Roommate with her twin daughters, Im Ra-yool, Im Ra-hee and her husband, Hyo-sung.

2016–present: S.E.S. reunited 
On 28 May, Shoo with S.E.S. members Bada and Eugene attended a charity event, Green Heart Bazaar. In October 2016, Shoo along with Bada and Eugene re-formed S.E.S. to celebrate their 20th anniversary since the debut of the group. They started their project of the 20th anniversary debut with released digital single "Love[Story]", a remake of their 1999 single "Love", through SM Entertainment's digital project SM Station on 28 November and its music video released on 29 December.

In early December 2016, they aired their ten episode reality show Remember, I'm Your S.E.S., which broadcast through mobile app Oksusu. To accompany their 20th anniversary debut, they held a concert, Remember, the Day, on 30 and 31 December at Sejong University's Daeyang Hall in Seoul.

On 2 January, the special album of their 20th anniversary debut Remember was released. The album consists of double lead singles. "Remember" was digitally released on 1 January and "Paradise" was released along with the album on 2 January. They held a fanmeet as their last project of 20th anniversary debut called I Will Be There, Waiting For You on 1 March 2017.

Personal life 
Shoo married basketball player, Im Hyo-sung on 11 April 2010, at the Seoul Renaissance Hotel. Shoo was pregnant at the time. In June 2010, the couple welcomed their first son, Im Yoo. In April 2013, Shoo gave birth to twin daughters, Im Ra-yool and Im Ra-hee.

In December 2018, Shoo was prosecuted for gambling in several countries.

Discography

Single albums

Collaborations

Participation in Albums

Filmography

Films

Dramas

Variety show

Hosting

Ambassadorship
Ambassadors solve gambling problems (2022)

Musical theatre

References

External links

 

1981 births
Living people
S.E.S. (group) members
Japanese-language singers
K-pop singers
South Korean women pop singers
South Korean female idols
South Korean film actresses
South Korean musical theatre actresses
South Korean television actresses
Actresses of Japanese descent
People from Yokohama
People from Seoul
Japanese people of South Korean descent
South Korean people of Japanese descent
Zainichi Korean people